Bagarius yarrelli, also known as the giant devil catfish or goonch, is a very large species of catfish in the genus Bagarius found in rivers in the Indian subcontinent. It may be synonymous with B. bagarius.

Etymology 
The species is known by many names throughout its range in the Indian subcontinent. It is known as the goonch in Urdu, Hindi and Punjabi, baghar or baghair in Bengali and Bihari (these names being the origin of the genus name Bagarius), gauns in Rajasthani, gorua (গৰুৱা) and baghmas (বাঘমাছ) in Assamese and bodh in Chhattisgarhi.

Taxonomy 
The species is frequently taxonomically confused with B. bagarius. A study published in 2021 found B. yarrelli to be a junior synonym of B. bagarius, likely necessitating a merge of B. yarrelli into B. bagarius.

Distribution and habitat

It is found in large rivers in the South Asia, including rivers with fast current, particularly in deeper pools near faster current, but never in small streams. It is found in the Indus and Ganges basins as well as most of southern India east of the Western Ghats. Two other populations were also formerly thought to exist in Southeast Asia (one population in the Mekong-Chao Phraya basin and the other from the Xe Bang Fai of Laos south to Indonesia), but a 2021 study found the former to represent a new species B. vegrandis, and the latter to represent the distinct species B. lica, previously synonymized with B. yarrelli.

Threats 
While still abundant, the species is considered vulnerable on the IUCN Red List due to excessive, unsustainable overharvesting of the species. Hydroelectric projects such as those on the Indravati River may affect the habitat of the species and adversely impact it.

Cultural significance 
The Order of the Fish was the highest honour of the Mughal Empire and named after this fish. 

In Chhattisgarh, the species is worshipped by tribal communities such as the Murias and Gonds, and is popularly referred to as the "shark of the Bastar". There have been efforts to name it the official state fish of Chhattisgarh.

See also 
Kali River goonch attacks

References

External links
 The Daily Star (Bangladesh): "Giant Baghair caught in Jamuna" (2009)

Sisoridae
Catfish of Asia
Fish of South Asia
Freshwater fish of India
Fish described in 1839
Vulnerable fish
Vulnerable biota of Asia
Apex predators